Sidney Brown (born August 21, 1976), better known as Omen is an American record producer from Harlem. He has produced for artists such as Drake, Beyoncé, Action Bronson, Lil Wayne, Ludacris, Fabolous, Vado, Memphis Bleek, Redman, Keith Murray, Immortal Technique, and Amil.

Early life and career
Omen's production was featured on early Roc-A-Fella releases by Memphis Bleek and Amil. Omen produced "Everybody" from Memphis Bleek's debut album Coming of Age and "No 1 Can Compare" from Amil's debut album All Money Is Legal.

Further placements include "Change You or Change Me" and "Why Wouldn't I" from Fabolous's Street Dreams, "Taste This" from Mýa's Moodring, and "Swagga Back" from Keith Murray's Def Jam debut He's Keith Murray.

Omen also provided the entire score for the Roc-A-Fella/Universal Pictures release Paper Soldiers in 2002.

Commercial breakthrough and Grammy Award
In 2006 Omen produced "Tell It Like It Is" for Ludacris which appeared as the b-side to the single "Money Maker." "Tell It Like It Is" was featured on Ludacris's double album Release Therapy, which won the 2007 Grammy Award for Best Rap Album, thus earning Omen his first Grammy award and certificate.

Omen was also featured on Redman's Red Gone Wild album, producing the song "Soopaman Luva 6" which featured Hurricane G.

Thank Me Later
Through Omen's collaborations with Canadian music producer Noah "40" Shebib, he was introduced to Drake who recorded the song "Shut It Down"  featuring The-Dream, for his album, Thank Me Later.

Further co-production with Noah "40" Shebib led Omen to co-produce Lil Wayne’s "I'm Single" featured on No Ceilings. The video for "I'm Single" premiered on MTV2 on April 18th, 2010. "I'm Single" was also released on iTunes on May 11th, 2010. I'm Single was officially released on Lil Wayne's I'm Not A Human Being album, which reached  #1 on the Billboard 200.

Production credits
2015
"Actin' Crazy" by Action Bronson 
2013
"Mine" by Beyoncé from "Beyoncé"
2012
"What Happened 2 U" by Usher from "Looking 4 Myself"
"Black Hero Theme Musik Mixtape" By Omen and The Elaborate Musik Orchestra
"Vans On" by T. Mills Single
"Circus Act" by Angelina Lavo
"Jealous Girls" by Angelina Lavo
2011
"Applause" by Omen and the Elaborate Musik Orchestra featuring XV, 4IZE, Ashton Travis and Jigsaw Tha Puzzla 
"Get Back" by Diggy Simmons, Ashton Travis, and Mike Jaggerr from Black Hero Theme Musik
"Negro Spiritual" by Mickey Factz, Ashton Travis, Nickelus F, Luckie Day, and The C3 Choir from Black Hero Theme Musik
"All For Me" by XV, Vado, Cyhi Da Prynce, and Erin Christine from Zero Heroes
2010
"Polo" remix by Vado featuring Young Dro
"Polo" by Vado from Slime Flu
"I'm Single" by Lil Wayne from I'm Not A Human Being
"Shut It Down" by Drake featuring The-Dream from Thank Me Later
2009
"I'm Single" by Lil Wayne from No Ceilings
2008
"Overdose On Life" featuring Drake, Mickey Factz, and Travis McCoy from Gym Class Heroes
2007
"Soopaman Luva 6" by Redman featuring Hurricane G from Red Gone Wild
2006
"Tell It Like It Is" by Ludacris from Release Therapy
2003
"Why Wouldn't I" and "Change Your or Change Me" by Fabolous from Street Dreams
"The Cause Of Death by Immortal Technique from Revolutionary Vol. 2
"Swagger Back" by Keith Murray from He's Keith Murray
2001
"One Day" by Fabolous from Ghetto Fabolous
2000
"No 1 Can Compare" by Amil from All Money Is Legal
1999
"Everybody" by Memphis Bleak from Coming of Age

References

Living people
1976 births
African-American record producers
Record producers from New York (state)
People from Harlem
21st-century African-American people
20th-century African-American people